Backstage is a 1927 American silent comedy film directed by Phil Goldstone and starring William Collier Jr., Barbara Bedford and Alberta Vaughn. It was produced and distributed by the independent studio Tiffany Pictures.

Synopsis
Four chorus girls find themselves out of work when their show goes bust while still in rehearsals. One of them goes to live at the apartment of the manager, leading her boyfriend to mistakenly believe that she is now a kept woman.

Cast
 William Collier Jr. as Owen Mackay
 Barbara Bedford as 	Julia Joyce
 Alberta Vaughn as Myrtle McGinnis
 Eileen Percy as Fanny
 Shirley O'Hara as 	Jane
 Gayne Whitman as 	Frank Carroll
 Jocelyn Lee as Flo
 Guinn 'Big Boy' Williams as Mike Donovan 
 James Harrison as Charlie
 Brooks Benedict as 	Harry
 Lincoln Plumer as Mr. Durkin
 Marcia Harris as Landlady
 Louise Carver as 	Referee
 John Batten as Eddie

References

Bibliography
 Munden, Kenneth White. The American Film Institute Catalog of Motion Pictures Produced in the United States, Part 1. University of California Press, 1997.

External links
 

1927 films
1927 comedy films
1920s English-language films
American silent feature films
Silent American comedy films
American black-and-white films
Films directed by Phil Goldstone
Tiffany Pictures films
1920s American films